is a railway station in Nishinari-ku, Osaka, Osaka Prefecture, Japan, operated by the private railway operator Nankai Electric Railway.

Lines
Kishinosato-Tamade Station is served by the Nankai Main Line as well as the Koya Line, and has the station number "NK06".

Layout
The station is elevated and has five platforms serving five tracks in total. Two side platforms serve the Koya Line, and one side platform parallel to the Nankai Line serves the Koya Line (Shiomibashi Line). Two tracks of the Nankai Main Line are served by an island platform with a passing track for Namba outside of track 4.

Platforms

Adjacent stations

|-
!colspan=5|Nankai Electric Railway

History
Kishinosato-Tamade Station opened in April 1993 as a result of the merger of two former stations, namely Kishinosato Station and Tamagi Station.

See also
 List of railway stations in Japan

References

External links

  

Railway stations in Japan opened in 1900
Railway stations in Osaka Prefecture